Blendr was an online dating application based on geosocial networking for Android, iOS and Facebook. It is designed to connect like-minded people near to each other. It was created by Joel Simkhai and patterned after his previous app Grindr which is instead aimed at gay men. Blendr claims to be "powered by" Badoo but largely appears to be the same service. As of 2022, it had 200 million users worldwide and requires users to be over the age of 18.

As of 31st October 2022 Blendr ceased activity in all territories worldwide. A statement on the Blendr website stated that all user data would be deleted by 30th November 2022 and the website would go offline from the 7th December 2022.

Description
The application combines GPS location sensing with a social networking framework, to provide users with the opportunity to meet people who are near to each other. The application can also be used to communicate with people in real time about a location, such as getting information about the current status of a local restaurant, or for determining whether a club currently holds people that the user might want to meet. Users must be over the age of 18.

Users provide a photograph and basic information about their interests (though they are not required to give out their actual name or other personal details), and then are able to browse other people who are nearby to their present location.  In order to protect the privacy of its users, the application only provides a rough estimate of the user's location, and also allows users to limit themselves to contact to people who meet their self-defined criteria.  Simkhai specifically designed Blendr to be less focused on casual sexual encounters than Grindr, intending it to be a tool for meeting new people who share common interests from business to hobbies and relationships of all types.  The company has strict rules forbidding the use of nudity, pictures or written descriptions of sexual acts, and racist statements or other hate speech.

Platforms
Blendr is currently available through the website, or for iOS devices through the iTunes app store and for Android through Google Play. As of September 2012, the application is free and supported by advertising, with a subscription option for increased functionality.

History
Blendr was announced to the press at SXSW on March 14, 2011, under the code name Project Amicus.  The name "Blendr" was ultimately revealed when the app launched in the iTunes app store on September 8, 2011.
Blendr announced that their services will cease on October 31, 2022.

See also

Comparison of online dating services
Timeline of online dating services

References

iOS software
Geosocial networking
Meta Platforms applications
Mobile social software
LGBT-related websites
2011 software
Android (operating system) software
Online dating applications